Franz Freiherr Rohr von Denta (30 October 1854 – 9 December 1927) was an Austro-Hungarian field marshal and field commander who served as the last commander of the Austro-Hungarian First Army.

Early life

Born in Arad, Kingdom of Hungary, Austrian Empire (modern-day Romania), in 1854 as Franz Denta, son of an army NCO, he became a lieutenant in the 3 Galizisches Uhlanen-Regiment Erzherzog Carl in 1876 upon graduating from the Theresian Military Academy in Wiener-Neustadt. He later attended the Austrian War College. Having attained the rank of Colonel, he was appointed Chief of Staff of II Corps in September 1897, a position in which he served until April 1901. By 1903 Denta was commanding the 73 Landwehr-Brigade at Pressburg/Pozsony (modern-day Bratislava) and in 1909 was made General Inspector of military educational establishments. In 1911 he was promoted to the rank of General der Kavallerie and appointed commander of the Hungarian Landwehr (Honved) in 1913.

War service

Responsible for the task of defending the southwestern frontier and historic heartlands of the Empire following the Italian declaration of war on May 23, 1915, Rohr was appointed commander of Armeegruppe Rohr on May 27 and took charge of all troops from Graz to Innsbruck.

Having overseen the successful defense of the Carinthian frontier, Rohr was promoted to the rank of Generaloberst on January 1, 1916, and made commander of the new 10th Army following the dissolution of his army-group in anticipation of the Tyrol Offensive. With the halting of all offensive operations on the Italian front by the Imperial army in the face of the Brusilov Offensive, the Tyrol effort was prematurely brought to an end and Rohr was transferred to command  the 11th Army, also in the Trento district in June 1916.

In February 1917, and with the promotion of Gen. Arz von Straussenberg to the position of Chief of the General Staff, Rohr took charge of the 1st Army and for the first time served as a commander on the Eastern Front. On April 14, 1917, he was elevated to the nobility, taking the rank of Baron and the title Rohr von Denta.

Promoted to the position of Field Marshal on January 30, 1918, Rohr continued in command of the 1st Army until its disbandment following peace with Romania on April 15, 1918.

Retirement

Retiring from command at war’s end, Rohr was nevertheless appointed Field Marshal in the army of newly independent Hungary.  Freiherr Rohr von Denta died in the village of Rodaun, near Vienna, on 9 December 1927.

Honours & Decorations

 Military Service Cross 1st Class
 Grand Cross of the Order of Leopold
 Knights' Cross 1st Class of the Order of the Iron Crown
 Captain of the Hungarian Trabantenleibgarde (Life Guards)

Selected Service Record

 1876 Lieutenant (3.Galizisches Uhlanen-Regiment Erzherzog Carl)
 1896 Colonel (General Staff)
 1903 Major General (73.Landwehr-IBrig. at Preßburg)
 1909 General Inspector of military educational establishments
 1911 General der Kavallerie
 1916 Generaloberst
 1918 Feldmarschall

See also
Arthur Arz von Straußenburg

References

1854 births
1927 deaths
People from Arad, Romania
Field marshals of Austria
Austro-Hungarian Army officers
Austro-Hungarian military personnel of World War I
Theresian Military Academy alumni